Ala Kheir (born April 1, 1985, in Nyala, Sudan) is a Sudanese photographer, cinematographer and mechanical engineer. He became known as one of the founders of the Sudanese Photographers Group in Khartoum in 2009 and through international exhibitions of his photographs, as well as for networking and training for photographers in Africa.

Biography and artistic career 

Kheir studied mechanical engineering in Malaysia and started as a self-taught photographer. Upon his return to Sudan, he and other photographers in Khartoum established the Sudanese Photographers Group. This group started taking and teaching photography as an art form, including other aspiring photographers into their workshops and exhibitions.

Kheir also has been involved in networking and training for photographers in Africa, notably with the 'Centers of Learning for Photography in Africa' in Johannesburg, South Africa. This network brings together African platforms active in photography education, where the members "exchange ideas and teaching methodologies and also learn as trainers."

An example of such training and networking were a series of workshops and photo exhibitions in Khartoum between 2014 and 2016, called 'Mugran Foto Week'. The exhibition of 2016 presented the collective results of a workshop called 'Modern Times''', conducted the year before by photographers Michelle Lukidis from South Africa and André Lützen from Germany.

In 2021, Kheir served as a judge on the panel for the international Contemporary African Photography Prize (CAP) in Basel, Switzerland, "awarded annually to five photographers, whose works were created on the African continent, or which engage with the African diaspora."

Ala Kheir's photographs have been published by The Guardian, Brownbook magazine, Dubai, or the World Architecture Community. In 2020, his work was featured among 17 contemporary African photographers in the book The Journey. New Positions in African Photography. From 2008 to 2018, these African photographers had been invited by local German cultural centres of the Goethe-Institut to attend masterclasses, curated by Simon Njami and established African photographers, such as Akinbode Akinbiyi. In the 2021 French book on 52 contemporary African artists Oh! AfricArt'', Kheir and his photographs are featured as the only artist from Sudan. For their 2022 contest, World Press Photo nominated Kheir as jury member from Africa.

In the magazine article 'Street Photography: A glimpse into Khartoum architecture and urban design', Kheir reflected on the nature of street photography:

Group and individual exhibitions 

 Reframing Neglect, Milan, New York and Abu Dhabi, Italy, USA and United Arab Emirates 2022/2023
 Revisiting Khartoum, African Capitals, France 2017
 Revisiting Khartoum, Dakar Biennale, Senegal 2016 
 Khartoum 2 Addis, Venice Biennale, Italy 2015 
 Africa, Big chance, Big chance, Milan, Italy 2014
 Invisible Borders, group exhibition, Addis Photo Festival, Ethiopia 2012
 Khartoum (solo exhibition), Addis Photo Festival 2012
 The Un-governables, group exhibition in New York 2012
 Feel the color, Khartoum, 2009 (co-exhibition with Dia Khalil)
 50+1, Malaysia, Kuala Lumpur 2007

Awards 

 Our Continent, Our Future photo competition, 2nd prize, 2013 
 Connect for Climate photo competition, 2nd prize, 2012
 UN education photograph, 2010

See also 
Photography in Sudan

References

Further reading

External links 

 Webpage of Ala Kheir
Ala Kheir at pentaxphotogallery.com
Centers of Learning for Photography in Africa
Mugran Foto Encounter 2015 in Khartoum, documentary video on YouTube

1985 births
Sudanese photographers
Sudanese artists
Living people
21st-century Sudanese artists
People from Darfur